William Humberstone (fl. 1377) was an English Member of Parliament.

He was a Member (MP) of the Parliament of England for Leicester in 1377.

References

Year of birth missing
Year of death missing
14th-century English people
People from Lewes
Members of the Parliament of England (pre-1707)